Jeff Suffering (born Jeff Bettger), is the former lead singer of Ninety Pound Wuss, Raft of Dead Monkeys, and Suffering and the Hideous Thieves. Suffering also played bass in Team Strike Force a worship band that was part of Mars Hill Church in Seattle, Washington where he served as a Pastor for Biblical Living | Arts Ministry until 2013. He is currently working on a project called "DRYBNZ" with Joe Mendonca.

Discography 
Ninety Pound Wuss
see Ninety Pound Wuss discography

Raft of Dead Monkeys
see Raft of Dead Monkeys discography

Suffering and the Hideous Thieves
 Rocky Votolato split 7-inch (2002)
 Real Panic Formed (2003)
 Double split EP with The Hush Hush (2003)
 Chris Staples split 7-inch (2004)
 Rats in Heaven (2004)
 All my Friends are on Prozac (2005)
 Ashamed (2005)

References

External links
 
 
  Jeff Suffering MySpace page
 
 

Living people
American male singers
American Calvinist and Reformed Christians
Mars Hill Church people
Year of birth missing (living people)